Nic Grindrod (born 12 January 1975) is a racecar driver. He has raced the #22 pickup since 2002 in the UK Pickup Truck Racing series.

2007 Rockingham Oval Championship
On 16 September 2007, Grindrod took 2nd place at the final Rockingham race, which was enough for him to secure the 2007 Rockingham Oval Championship.

Career history
2005 Pickup Truck Racing Championship – championship winner
2006 Pickup Truck Racing Championship – championship winner
2007 Pickup Truck Racing Championship – 2nd overall, Rockingham Oval Champion
2008 Pickup Truck Racing Championship – 13th overall 2nd Rockingham Oval Championship
2009 Pickup Truck Racing Championship -

References

English racing drivers
Living people
1975 births